Roccasparvera is a comune (municipality) in the Province of Cuneo in the Italian region Piedmont, located about  south of Turin and about  southwest of Cuneo.

Roccasparvera borders the following municipalities: Bernezzo, Borgo San Dalmazzo, Cervasca, Gaiola, Rittana, and Vignolo.

Twin towns
 Reillanne, France (1996)

References

Cities and towns in Piedmont